Edward French (born April 17, 1951) is an American makeup artist who has worked on over 70 films and television shows since 1981.

He was nominated at the 64th Academy Awards for Star Trek VI: The Undiscovered Country. This was for Best Makeup. He shared his nomination with Michael Mills and Richard Snell.

In addition, he won an Emmy Award for his work on the TV show House.

Selected filmography

References

External links

Living people
American make-up artists
1951 births
Artists from Boston
Emmy Award winners